"Rock the Party" is a song by English boy band Five. It was released on 22 October 2001 from Kingsize, also included in their greatest hits album Greatest Hits (2001). It was released as a double A-side with "Closer to Me".

The song is based on a sample of Frankie Valli's "Grease," the theme song of the movie of the same name.

Music video
The music video, directed by Sean Smith, features an animated version of the band on their night out at a nightclub.

Track listing
European CD1
 "Rock the Party" (Single Remix) – 2:49
 "Set Me Free" – 2:57

European CD2
 "Rock the Party" (Single Remix) – 2:49
 "On Top of the World" – 3:37
 "Breakdown" – 3:21
 "Set Me Free" – 2:57
 "Rock the Party" (Video) – 2:49

European Cassette single
 "Rock the Party" (Single Remix) – 2:49
 "Set Me Free" – 2:57
 "Keep on Movin'" (2002 World Cup Mix) – 3:14

Australian CD single
 "Rock the Party" (Single Remix) – 2:49
 "Closer to Me" (Single Remix) – 4:28
 "Let's Dance" (The Maverick Monkey Radio Edit) – 3:21
 "1, 2, 3, 4, 5" – 3:21

Charts

References

2001 singles
2001 songs
Five (band) songs
Songs written by Richard Stannard (songwriter)
Songs written by Julian Gallagher
Song recordings produced by Richard Stannard (songwriter)
Songs written by Sean Conlon
Songs written by Abz Love
Songs written by Jason "J" Brown
Sony BMG singles
Songs about parties